The men's 100 metres event at the 2003 Asian Athletics Championships was held in Manila, Philippines on September 20–21.

Medalists

Results

Heats
Wind: Heat 1: 0.0 m/s, Heat 2: +1.0 m/s, Heat 3: -0.1 m/s, Heat 4: +0.3 m/s, Heat 5: -0.1 m/s

Quarterfinals
Wind: Heat 1: -0.3 m/s, Heat 2: +0.2 m/s, Heat 3: -0.1 m/s

Semifinals
Wind: Heat 1: +0.8 m/s, Heat 2: 0.0 m/s

Final
Wind: 0.0 m/s

References

2003 Asian Athletics Championships
100 metres at the Asian Athletics Championships